Vasyl Mykolayovych Mazur (born 23 May 1970) is a  Ukrainian professional football coach and a former player. He is an assistant coach with the Under-21 squad of FC Krylia Sovetov Samara.

He is a brother of another professional footballer Serhiy Mazur.

Playing career
He made his professional debut in the Soviet Top League in 1990 for FC Shakhtar Donetsk.

References

1970 births
Living people
Soviet footballers
Ukrainian footballers
Ukrainian expatriate footballers
FC Shakhtar Donetsk players
FC Zorya Luhansk players
FC Kryvbas Kryvyi Rih players
PFC Krylia Sovetov Samara players
FC Lokomotiv Nizhny Novgorod players
FC Sokol Saratov players
Expatriate footballers in Russia
Russian Premier League players
FC Arsenal Tula players
Association football defenders
Ukrainian expatriate sportspeople in Russia
FC Yenisey Krasnoyarsk players
Twin sportspeople
Sportspeople from Donetsk Oblast